Penn Hills is a township with home rule status in Allegheny County, Pennsylvania, United States. The population was 41,059 as of the 2020 census. A suburb of Pittsburgh, Penn Hills is the second-largest municipality in Allegheny County.

History

In 1788, when Allegheny County was formed, the area now known as Penn Hills was part of Pitt Township.  On January 16, 1850, Robert Logan, Thomas Davison and Daniel Bieber were appointed by the court to review the boundaries of a new township to be formed from the northern part of Wilkins.  This new township was formed and named Adams, until August 1850 when the action of the court was reconsidered to change the name to McNair Township.  The name was again changed to Penn Township by Act of Assembly and approved on February 10, 1851.  In 1958 Penn Township became Penn Hills Township, and in 1976 Penn Hills became a home rule municipality.  The earliest population was given in 1860, when there were 1,821 people living in Penn Township.  The population grew to 2,685 in 1870 and 3,291 in 1880.

Geography
Penn Hills is located at  (40.476218, -79.833302). Penn Hills uses the ZIP codes of 15235 and 15147; and the community is within area codes 412 and 878.

Communities
Neighborhoods within Penn Hills include Blackridge, Churchill Valley, Crescent Hills, Eastmont, Eastvue, Laketon Heights, Lincoln Park, Milltown, Nadine, Newfield, North Bessemer, Penn Ridge, Point Breeze, Rosedale, Sandy Creek, Shannon Heights, Universal, Valemont Heights, Gascola, Shadow Shuttle, Frankstown West, Frankstown Estates, Eastwood, and Verona Hilltop.

Streams
Penn Hills is bordered to the north by the Allegheny River. In addition, the waterways listed below flow through the Municipality:
 Plum Creek flows through the Municipality, creating the border with Plum Borough. The stream passes by North Bessemer Field, Milltown Community Park and Penn Hills Community Park before briefly entering into Oakmont and emptying into the Allegheny River.
 Sandy Creek starts near the intersection of Verona Road and Graham Boulevard Extension and parallels Verona Road to its intersection with Sandy Creek Road where the stream turns and follows the road until it empties into the Allegheny River.
 Thompson Run begins near Linton Middle School and runs along Stotler Road, Frey Road and Thompson Run Road where it forms the Municipality's border with Monroeville. It eventually flows into the Monongahela River.
 Quigley Run forms near the Green Oaks Country Club and passes under Allegheny River Boulevard (PA 130) before directly emptying into the Allegheny River.
 Shades Run, in the Lincoln Park neighborhood, begins off of Tyler Road and flows under Lincoln Road, forming the Municipality's border with the City of Pittsburgh. It crosses under Allegheny River Boulevard (PA 130) before directly emptying into the Allegheny River.
 Duffs Run begins along Long Road in the Churchill Valley neighborhood before winding through the former Churchill Valley Country Club and running into Churchill and Wilkins Township before joining Thompson Run.

Surrounding communities
Penn Hills has ten land borders, including Verona and Oakmont to the north, Plum Borough to the east and northeast, Monroeville to the southeast, Wilkins Township, Churchill and Wilkinsburg to the south and the Pittsburgh neighborhoods of East Hills to the south, Homewood North to the southwest and Lincoln–Lemington–Belmar to the west.

The Allegheny River borders Penn Hills to the northwest with two neighborhoods running adjacent across the way: O'Hara Township and the borough of Blawnox.

Demographics

As of the census of 2010, there were 42,329 people living in the township. The population density was 2,268.2 people per square mile (949.7/km2). There were 20,355 housing units at an average density of 1,069.8 per square mile (413.0/km2). The racial makeup of the township was 60.03% (25,398) White, 37.03% (15,668) African American, 0.98% (409) Asian, 0.01% (4) Pacific Islander, 0.55% from (232) other races. Hispanic or Latino of any race were 1.41% (598) of the population. There is a sizable Italian American population in the township.

There were 19,490 households, out of which 26.3% had children under the age of 18 living with them, 51.1% were married couples living together, 13.5% had a female householder with no husband present, and 31.9% were non-families. 28.2% of all households were made up of individuals, and 13.2% had someone living alone who was 65 years of age or older. The average household size was 2.38 and the average family size was 2.91.

In the township the population was spread out, with 21.7% under the age of 18, 6.3% from 18 to 24, 27.0% from 25 to 44, 25.3% from 45 to 64, and 19.7% who were 65 years of age or older. The median age was 42 years. For every 100 females there were 88.6 males. For every 100 females age 18 and over, there were 84.0 males.

The median income for a household in the township was $39,960, and the median income for a family was $46,971. Males had a median income of $36,143 versus $27,331 for females. The per capita income for the township was $20,161. About 5.6% of families and 7.5% of the population were below the poverty line, including 10.8% of those under age 18 and 6.2% of those age 65 or over.

Government and politics
The Penn Hills Government Center is located at 102 Duff Road. This is the home to all municipal offices, including the Penn Hills Police Department and Penn Hills EMS. All public safety divisions are dispatched by Allegheny County 911.

Penn Hills Volunteer Fire Department

Station 1 - 7520 Mt. Carmel Rd

Station 2 - 5806 Verona Rd

Station 3 - 1701 Leechburg Rd

Station 4 - 1002 Center Ave

Station 5 - 2797 Robinson Blvd

Station 6 - 2240 Main St - CLOSED - DE-CERTIFIED (2016)

Station 7 - 125 Universal Rd

Fire Marshal - 102 Duff Rd

Fire Academy - 102 Duff Rd

Government/elected officials
 Mayor - Pauline Calabrese
 Deputy Mayor - Catherine Sapp 
 Council Member - John Petrucci 
 Council Member - Frank Pecora 
 Council Member - James Getsy
 Controller - Nicholas J. Futules
 Municipal Manager - Scott Andrejchak 
 Deputy Clerk - Diane Gionta Fitzhenry
 District Justice - Anthony DeLuca Jr.
 US Congress - 14th District - Michael F. Doyle
 US Congress - 18th District - Conor Lamb
 State Senate - 43rd District - Jay Costa
 US Senate - Toomey, Patrick J.
 US Senate - Bob Casey Jr.
 State Legislature - 32nd District - Anthony M. DeLuca

Education

Penn Hills is served by the Penn Hills School District, which includes: Penn Hills Elementary School, Linton Middle School, and Penn Hills High School.

Transportation
Interstate 376 runs through the southernmost part of Penn Hills, linking it and other eastern suburbs to downtown Pittsburgh.

Pennsylvania Route 791, more commonly referred to as Rodi Road, connects heavily traveled Frankstown Road (at PA-791's northern terminus) with I-376 at its southern terminus. Numerous restaurants, fast food locations, stores, gas stations, and hotels can be found on Rodi, as many truckers and travelers using I-376 use the Penn Hills exit to refuel or  stay overnight.

For air travel, Pittsburgh International Airport, located in the western portion of the county, is most commonly used. However, the Allegheny County Airport in West Mifflin is also still in use.

Several bus lines of the Port Authority of Allegheny County offer service to Downtown Pittsburgh, and the Port Authority also has several routes and "flyers" located in Penn Hills.

Major roads
  /   Penn Lincoln Parkway (Penn Hills is exit 81)
  Rodi Road
  Frankstown, Saltsburg Roads
  Coal Hollow, Sandy Creek, Beulah Roads
  The Yellow Belt runs through Penn Hills via Hulton, Frankstown, and Rodi Roads
  The Green Belt is signed as Robinson Blvd, Verona Road, and Sandy Creek Road within Penn Hills

Notable people
 Dion Bentley
 Barry Church
 Aaron Donald
 Scott Edgar (born 1955), college basketball coach
 Bill Fralic
 Kevin Peter Hall
 George Karl, former NBA player and coach; member of NBA Hall of Fame
 Abby Lee Miller
 Guy Primus
 Nisha Rajagopal
 Salima Rockwell
 Tom Tumulty

See also
 Blackridge, Pennsylvania
 Penn Hills School District

References

External links
 Township website
 This Is Penn Hills : Community News & Events

Home Rule Municipalities in Allegheny County, Pennsylvania
Townships in Allegheny County, Pennsylvania
Townships in Pennsylvania